The speckled kingsnake (Lampropeltis holbrooki) is a nonvenomous species of kingsnake  endemic to the United States.

Description

The common name is derived from its pattern, which is black, with small yellow-white specks, one speck in the center of almost every dorsal scale. It is also known as the "salt-and-pepper snake".

Geographic range
The speckled kingsnake is found in the central and southern United States from southern Iowa to the Gulf of Mexico. Its range overlaps that of the desert kingsnake, Lampropeltis splendida, and it is known to intergrade with that species.

Habitat
The speckled kingsnake prefers wetter habitats than other kingsnakes, such as swamps and rivers, but it does commonly venture to dry areas such as woodlands and grassy fields.

Diet
The diet of the speckled kingsnake consists of mammals, birds, rodents, frogs, lizards, and other snakes. It kills by constriction.

Behavior
When threatened, the speckled kingsnake shakes its tail like a rattlesnake to deter predators. It frequently expels musk and feces or bites when threatened. It is usually docile, often striking only one or two times after capture, and is frequently kept as a pet. It is commonly captive bred.

Taxonomy and etymology
This snake was first described by American herpetologist John Edwards Holbrook in 1842.  At that time, he called it Coronella sayi under the mistaken impression that it was the species previously described by Schlegel as Coluber sayi.  In 1902, Stejneger pointed out that because Coluber sayi is a different snake, Pituophis catenifer sayi, the name sayi could not be applied to this snake. Therefore, he proposed the name Lampropeltis holbrooki, honoring Holbrook. It was for many years considered a subspecies of L. getula, but has been elevated to full species status as L. holbrooki.

References

Further reading
Behler JL, King FW (1979). The Audubon Society Field Guide to North American Reptiles and Amphibians. New York: Alfred A. Knopf. 743 pp. . (Lampropeltis getulus holbrooki, p. 619 + Plate 560).
Conant R, Bridges W (1939). What Snake Is That?: A Field Guide to the Snakes of the United States East of the Rocky Mountains. (With 108 drawings by Edmond Malnate). New York and London: D. Appleton-Century. Frontispiece map + viii + 163 pp. + Plates A-C, 1-32. (Lampropeltis getulus holbrooki, pp. 77–78 + Plate12, Figure 35).
Holbrook JE (1842). North American Herpetology; or, A Description of the Reptiles Inhabiting the United States. Vol. III. [Second Edition]. Philadelphia: J. Dobson. 128 pp. + 30 plates. (Coronella sayi, pp. 99–101 + Plate 22).
Hubbs, Brian (2009). Common Kingsnakes: A Natural History of Lampropeltis getula. Tempe, Arizona: Tricolor Books. 436 pp. .
Schmidt KP, Davis DD (1941). Field Book of Snakes of the United States and Canada. New York: G.P. Putnam's Sons. 365 pp. (Lampropeltis getulus holbrooki, pp. 176–177, Figure 50 + Plate 19).
Stejneger L (1902). "The Reptiles of the Huachuca Mountains, Arizona". Proc. U.S. Nat. Mus. 25: 149–158. (Lampropeltis holbrooki, new name, p. 152).
Wright AH, Wright AA (1957). Handbook of Snakes of the United States and Canada. Ithaca and London: Comstock Publishing Associates, a division of Cornell University Press. 1,105 pp. (in two volumes). (Lampropeltis getulus holbrooki, pp. 387–391, Figure 118 + Map 33 on p. 373).

External links

Lamproletis getula. The IUCN Red List of Threatened Species.
Lampropeltis holbrooki. The Reptile Database.
Speckled Kingsnake. Reptiles and Amphibians of Iowa.

Lampropeltis
Reptiles described in 1902
Taxa named by Leonhard Stejneger